WIAC may refer to:

 WIAC (AM), a radio station (740 AM) licensed to San Juan, Puerto Rico
 WTOK-FM, a radio station (102.5 FM) licensed to San Juan, Puerto Rico, which held the call sign WIAC-FM until 2010 
 Wisconsin Intercollegiate Athletic Conference, a United States college athletic conference competing in NCAA Division III